Murase is a Japanese surname. Notable people with the surname include:

, Japanese voice actor
, Japanese footballer
, Japanese actress and voice actress
Robert Murase (1938–2005), American landscape architect
, Japanese actress
, Japanese idol and singer
, Japanese anime director and animator
, Japanese rower

Japanese-language surnames